is a private women's college in Minami-ku, Fukuoka, Japan. The predecessor of the school was founded in 1885 by American Methodist Missionary Jean "Jennie" Margaret Gheer. It was chartered as a junior women's college in 1964, and it became a four-year college in 1990.

External links
 Official website 

Educational institutions established in 1885
Christian universities and colleges in Japan
Private universities and colleges in Japan
Women's universities and colleges in Japan
Universities and colleges in Fukuoka Prefecture
1885 establishments in Japan